Carlos Olivier (Carlos Raúl Fernández Olivier) (26 January 195222 January 2007), was a Venezuelan actor, famous for his roles in telenovelas, including Leonela, El País de las Mujeres, Viva la Pepa, Las González, Engañada, and Los Querendones.

Olivier was a member of the Factory of Young Actors of RCTV. During the five years that he lived in the United States, Olivier appeared in two episodes of the police TV series Miami Vice, hosted the TV show El Gran Evento con Carlos Olivier on Telemundo, and recorded two albums with producer Emilio Estefan.

Olivier combined his passion for acting with the medicine.

Carlos Olivier died of a cardiac arrest in Caracas.

Filmography
Historia de amor
Prisionero de Zenda
El hombre de la máscara de hierro
La noche de los sapos
El ángel rebelde
Alejandra
Estefanía
Gómez
Me llamo Julián, te quiero
Secreto
Sor campanita
La dama de las camelias
Orgullo
La señora de Cárdenas
Natalia
Rosalinda
Angelito
Martha y Javier
Bienvenida Esperanza
Leonela
Miedo al amor
La muchacha de los ojos café
Enamorada
De mujeres
Pecado de Amor
Contra viento y marea
Carita pintada
Cuando Hay Pasion
Hay amores que matan
Viva la pepa
Las González
Engañada
¡Qué buena se puso Lola!
Los Querendones

See also
Venezuela
Venezuelan culture

People from Caracas
Venezuelan male telenovela actors
20th-century Venezuelan physicians
1952 births
2007 deaths